
Bruce Leonard Cathie (11 February 1930 – 2 June 2013) was a New Zealand airline pilot who wrote seven books related to flying saucers and a "World energy grid".

His central thesis was that he could use mathematics to describe a grid-like pattern on Earth (i.e. the Electro-dynamic field on Earth) that powers flying saucers and controls the dates and places where nuclear bombs can function; in his book "The Harmonic Conquest of Space".

In his book "The Harmonic Conquest of Space", he claimed to have successfully predicted and documented the detonation of an early French nuclear test using his harmonic "mathematics", which is based around trigonometry and geophysical latitude/longitude coordinates.

Cathie said that he first saw a flying saucer over the Manukau Harbour, Auckland in 1952 and in discussions with other airline pilots discovered this was not uncommon.

His first book Harmonic 33, was published in New Zealand in 1968 and reprinted in the United Kingdom by Sphere Books in 1980.

New Zealand millennial author Barry Smith claimed to have received his information on restrictions on nuclear weapons from Cathie.

An interview with him was played in the fourth episode of the fourth series of the US television program In Search of....

In co-operation with mathematician Rod Maupin they developed software (Gridpoint Atlas) that would plot the proposed grid-lines on Google Earth.

Cathie's gridline theory was discussed in Season 12, Episode 122: "Ancient Architects" of the US television program, Ancient Aliens. His work was mentioned near the end of the episode. The original air date was May 19, 2017.

Cathie died in Takapuna in 2013.

Books
 Harmonic 33 (1968), 
 Harmonic 695 - The UFO and Anti-Gravity (1971), 
 Harmonic 288 - The Pulse of the Universe (1977), 
 Harmonic 371244 - The Bridge to Infinity (1989), 
 The Energy Grid (1990), 
 The Harmonic Conquest of Space (1994),

Documentary & Video
 The Harmonic Code - The Harmonics of Reality (2007)

See also
UFO sightings in New Zealand

References

External links
Official site 
?
Gridpoint Atlas

1930 births
2013 deaths
New Zealand writers
New Zealand aviators
Ufologists
Commercial aviators